Yoon Sang-chul (born June 14, 1965) is a former South Korean footballer. During the course of his career, he played for only one club, FC Seoul. He was the first player to score 100 goals in the K League.

Honours and awards

Player
Lucky-Goldstar Hwangso / LG Cheetahs / Anyang LG Cheetahs
 K League Winner (1): 1990
 K League Runner-up (2): 1989, 1993
 League Cup Runner-up (2): 1992, 1994

Individual
 K League Top Scorer Award (2): 1990, 1994
 K League Top Assists Award (1): 1993
 K League Best XI (4): 1989, 1990, 1993, 1994
 K League Honorable Mention (1): 1993

External links
 
 Yoon Sang-chul – National Team stats at KFA 

Marconi Stallions FC players
National Soccer League (Australia) players
Expatriate soccer players in Australia
FC Seoul players
K League 1 players
Association football forwards
South Korean expatriate sportspeople in Australia
South Korean expatriate footballers
South Korea international footballers
South Korea B international footballers
South Korean footballers
Konkuk University alumni
Footballers from Seoul
1965 births
Living people
Newcastle Breakers FC players